Ryan Rupert Reid (born October 30, 1986) is an American-born Jamaican professional basketball player for the Kanazawa Samuraiz of Japanese B.League.

Reid played college basketball with the Florida State Seminoles. After four years in college, he was drafted by the Indiana Pacers with the 57th pick in the 2010 NBA Draft. After the draft, his draft rights were immediately traded to the Oklahoma City Thunder. However, the Thunder did not sign him to a contract and Reid went on to play with in the Tulsa 66ers, the NBA Development League (NBA D-League) affiliate of the Thunder. He played for the 66ers for one season before he was signed by the Thunder for the 2011–12 season.

Early life
Ryan Reid was born to Jasmine and Kenneth Mullings. He was born and grew up in Lauderdale Lakes, Florida. He attended and played for Boyd Anderson High School in his hometown. During his last three years with Boyd Anderson, he averaged 18 points, 12 rebounds and 3 blocked shots. After graduating in 2005, he attended Florida State University. He reportedly chose Florida State over Florida, Miami, Georgia, Houston and Pittsburgh. He also played basketball in the Amateur Athletic Union (AAU) with the Tallahassee Wildcats.

College career
Reid played under coach Leonard Hamilton for the Florida State Seminoles, who played in the Atlantic Coast Conference in the National Collegiate Athletic Association (NCAA) Division I. As a freshman, he played in all 35 games off the bench, averaging 2.9 points on 56.2 percent shooting and 3.2 rebounds in 16.1 minutes per game. In his sophomore season, he started 21 games and played a total of 25 games for the Seminoles. He improved his performance and averaged 5.6 points on 53.1 percent shooting and 5.0 rebounds in 24.1 minutes per game. He helped the Seminoles to the National Invitation Tournament (NIT) tournament in both years.

Reid played 35 games in his junior year, averaging 4.9 points on 44.0 percent shooting and 3.7 rebounds in 19.1 minutes per game. In his final year at college, Reid was named as the team captain. He played in 31 games and averaged 6.8 points on 49.1 percent shooting and 4.0 rebounds in 22.7 minutes per game. He helped the Seminoles to the NCAA Championship in his junior and senior season. Despite his low scoring and rebounding numbers, his biggest contribution for the Seminoles came at the defensive end. He became one of the best defenders in the college and successfully defended top opposing players. He became one of only three players in the Seminoles history to reach the postseason in all four years. Reid, who helped the Seminoles to 88 wins, also had more wins than any other player in school history. He finished his college career with 126 games with 5.0 points per game and 3.7 rebounds per game average. He graduated with a bachelor's degree in social science on May 1, 2010 and became the first person in his family to earn a college degree.

Professional career
Reid was automatically eligible for the 2010 NBA Draft after finishing his four-year college eligibility.  The Oklahoma City Thunder were the only NBA team which sought to work out before the draft. He was eventually drafted by the Indiana Pacers with the 57th pick in the draft and his rights were immediately traded to the Thunder in exchange for the rights to Magnum Rolle, the 51st pick. His selection was considered a surprise in the draft because some analysts did not even consider him as a top-100 prospect for the draft. Nevertheless, the Thunder was already impressed with Reid's defensive abilities and work ethic and decided to take a chance on him.

He played for the Thunder in the 2010 Orlando Summer League. He played in four games, averaging 8.3 points and 3.8 rebounds in 16.0 minutes per game. However, he didn't receive a contract offer or an invitation to the Thunder's training camp for the 2010–11 season. On November 26, 2010, he was acquired by the Tulsa 66ers, the D-League affiliate of the Thunder. His rights in the NBA are still held by the Thunder. Hence, the Thunder is the only team that is allowed to call up Reid to the NBA during the 2010–11 season. He averaged 8.5 points on 50.3 percent shooting and 5.8 rebounds per game in 48 games with the 66ers.

He returned to the 66ers for the 2011–12 season. After playing 8 games and averaging 11.8 points and 8.9 rebounds per game, he was called up to the Thunder training camp roster on December 13, 2011. On January 16, 2012, Reid returned to the 66ers on assignment from the Thunder. He was recalled on February 6, 2012.

On March 16, 2012, Reid was reassigned to the 66ers. He was recalled and then waived on March 21, 2012. He then returned to the 66ers on March 23, 2012.

On November 17, 2014 he signed with SLUC Nancy of the LNB Pro A.

On February 14, 2018 he signed with the St. John's Edge of NBL Canada.

References

External links
French League profile
D-League profile
NBA Draft profile
ESPN.com profile
College statistics @ Sports-Reference.com
Florida State Seminoles bio

Living people
1986 births
American expatriate basketball people in France
American men's basketball players
Basketball players from Florida
Chorale Roanne Basket players
Florida State Seminoles men's basketball players
Indiana Pacers draft picks
Kanazawa Samuraiz players
Niigata Albirex BB players
Oklahoma City Thunder players
People from Lauderdale Lakes, Florida
Power forwards (basketball)
Shimane Susanoo Magic players
SLUC Nancy Basket players
St. John's Edge players
Tulsa 66ers players
Sportspeople from Broward County, Florida
American expatriate basketball people in Japan
American expatriate basketball people in Canada